Vexilla vexillum, common name the vexillum rock shell, is a species of sea snail, a marine gastropod mollusk in the family Muricidae, the murex snails or rock snails.

References

Vexilla
Gastropods described in 1791
Taxa named by Johann Friedrich Gmelin